Group A of the 2005 FIFA Confederations Cup took place between 15 June and 21 June 2005. Germany won the group, and advanced to the second round, along with Argentina. Tunisia and Australia failed to advance.

Standings

All times local (CEST/UTC+2)

Matches

Argentina v Tunisia

Man of the Match:
Juan Román Riquelme (Argentina)

Assistant referees:
Alessandro Griselli (Italy)
Cristiano Copelli (Italy)
Fourth official:
Manuel Mejuto González (Spain)

Germany v Australia

Man of the Match:
Michael Ballack (Germany)

Assistant referees:
Amelio Andino (Paraguay)
Manuel Bernal (Paraguay)
Fourth official:
Mourad Daami (Tunisia)

Tunisia v Germany

Man of the Match:
Michael Ballack (Germany)

Assistant referees:
Anthony Garwood (Jamaica)
Joseph Taylor (Trinidad and Tobago)
Fourth official:
Matthew Breeze (Australia)

Australia v Argentina

Man of the Match:
Luciano Figueroa (Argentina)

Assistant referees:
Prachya Permpanich (Thailand)
Bengech Allaberdyev (Turkmenistan)
Fourth official:
Manuel Mejuto González (Spain)

Australia v Tunisia

Man of the Match:
Francileudo Santos (Tunisia)

Assistant referees:
Cristian Julio (Chile)
Mario Vargas (Chile)
Fourth official:
Herbert Fandel (Germany)

Argentina v Germany

Man of the Match:
Juan Román Riquelme (Argentina)

Assistant referees:
Roman Slyško (Slovakia)
Martin Balko (Slovakia)
Fourth official:
Roberto Rosetti (Italy)

References

A
2004–05 in German football
2004–05 in Argentine football
2004–05 in Tunisian football
2005 in Australian soccer